Kyauktan Township is a township of Yangon Region, located in the southern section of the region.

Prominent People from Kyauktan Township
Dr. Than Nyein (5 August 1936 – 21 May 2014), founder of National Democratic Force Party, was born in Khanaung east village.

References

External links
"Kyauktan Township" map, Myanmar Information Management Unit (MIMU) 

Townships of Yangon Region